Persicobacter diffluens is a bacterium from the genus of Porifericola which has been isolated from marine mud from Bombay in India.

References

External links
Type strain of Persicobacter diffluens at BacDive -  the Bacterial Diversity Metadatabase	

Cytophagia
Bacteria described in 1989